Jürg Marquard (born 13 July 1945) is a Swiss businessman and publisher. He belongs to the 300 wealthiest Swiss with a net worth of 500 million Swiss Francs (according to Bilanz).

Early life and education 
Marquard was born in Zürich and raised in Urdorf, the son of a dentist of German ancestry. He was still in school, when he engaged in journalism at a very young age. After he completed his Matura at the Wirtschaftsgymnasium der Kantonsschule Zürich (today a part of Kantonsschule Enge) he told his father not to pursue a college degree and instead become a full-time publisher of magazines. He was able to lend 1,000 Swiss Francs (3,500 adjusted to 2022) and start his first magazine Pop. This move was initially not favored by his family. Besides this activity he engaged several years as moderator of the Swiss Hitparade on Swiss Radio and was often referred as "Mr. Hitparade".

Career 
After the founding period, in which Marquard Pop edited himself, the magazine became increasingly commercial and, after various mergers with other German youth magazines, it became Pop/Rocky, the second largest German youth magazine behind Bravo. In 1998, Pop/Rocky was merged with the publisher's own youth and music magazine Popcorn, which had established itself as the international umbrella brand for the Marquard Media Group's youth magazine division. Marquard made the breakthrough in the German-language magazine market in 1981 with the magazine Cosmopolitan. Today he is also publishing those magazines exclusively in Poland and Hungary.

In early 2005 he became active as co-producer and protagonist of the reality series Traumjob, which has been a license version of Donald Trump's The Apprentice. This series achieved the highest ratings within Swiss Television. From 2019 to 2020 he was also active as investor in the Swiss version of Shark Tank, Höhle der Löwen (Schweiz), which aired on the private channel 3plus. where he invested in promising start-ups. He resigned from this position due to medical reasons, his succession was taken by DJ Antoine. Since 2019, he has also been involved in real estate investment and development activities around Lake Zurich. Together with development company Inizia AG and Urs Ledermann he formed LMI Property AG.

Since 1995, he serves as the Honorary consul of Hungary in Switzerland.

Private 
Marquard initially married Mexican-born Rocio, a native of Cancun, which whom he had daughter Aline. This marriage only lasted a couple of years. In 1994, he married American model Priscilla Ogilvie (b. 1966), which whom he had four children; Philipp, Audrey, Caroline and Alexandra. During this marriage he primarily resided in Miami, Florida, which wasn't for him and he wanted to return. This was the reason for the divorce. After that he had a brief liaison with racing driver Christina Surer.

In 2008, he married the third time, to Raquel Lehmann (b. 1963), also a former model. She was formerly married to Swiss actor Stefan Gubser and financier Roger Lehmann. She had two children from two previous marriages.

External links 
 Christoph Müller: Hallo Kollege! SRF Reporter on April 14, 2005 (in German)
 Geboren am – 13. Juli 1945 SRF am 9 August 2019

References 

1945 births
Living people